Niethammeriodes ustella is a species of snout moth described by Émile Louis Ragonot in 1887. It is found in Spain and North Africa, including Algeria.

The wingspan is about 18 mm.

References

Moths described in 1887
Phycitini